The 1997 Conference USA men's basketball tournament was held March 5–8 at the Kiel Center in St. Louis, Missouri.

Marquette defeated UNC Charlotte in the championship game, 60–52, to clinch their first Conference USA men's tournament championship.

The Golden Eagles, in turn, received an automatic bid to the 1997 NCAA tournament. They were joined in the tournament by fellow C-USA members UNC Charlotte, Cincinnati, and Louisville, who all earned at-large bids.

Format
With Houston officially joining Conference USA prior to 1996–97 season, total membership increased to twelve. The Cougars were entered directly into the conference's three four-team division structure, being placed into the White Division. 

With the addition of Houston, the tournament field expanded from eleven to twelve. Nonetheless, the overall structure remained largely the same: the top four teams were given byes into the quarterfinal round, and the remaining eight teams were entered into the preliminary round. All seeds were determined by regular season conference records, regardless of division.

Bracket

References

Conference USA men's basketball tournament
Tournament
Conference USA men's basketball tournament
Conference USA men's basketball tournament